Martin Christian Grau (born 26 March 1992) is a German track and field athlete who specialises in the 3000 metres steeplechase. He holds a personal best of 8:24.29 minutes for the event, set in 2014. He was the gold medallist at the 2015 Summer Universiade.

Career
Born in Höchstadt, Grau joined the local athletics club LSC Höchstadt/Aisch. His twin brother, Bastian Grau, also took up distance running. His international debut came at the age of eighteen, when he finished eleventh at the 2010 World Junior Championships in Athletics. He had his first international success at the 2011 European Athletics Junior Championships, where he was the steeplechase bronze medallist. He also ran in the junior race at the 2011 European Cross Country Championships that year, finishing 53rd.

Grau improved his steeplechase best to 8:47.43 minutes in 2012, then became the German under-23 champion in 2013. He ran at the 2013 European Athletics U23 Championships, but failed to make it to the final. After setting a personal best of 8:24.29 minutes in June 2014, he established himself as a senior athlete with a second-place finish behind France's Yoann Kowal at the 2014 European Team Championships Super League. At the 2014 German Athletics Championships he claimed the runner-up spot behind the more established Steffen Uliczka. He was selected to run for Germany at the 2014 European Athletics Championships, but finished only 13th in the final after having qualified as the second fastest athlete.

He returned to the European Team Championships in 2015, but managed only fourth on that occasion. The 2015 Universiade was the venue of his first international steeplechase title, where he beat all-comers in the student event with a run of 8:31.55 minutes.

Personal bests
2000 metres steeplechase – 5:58.89 min (2009)
3000 metres steeplechase – 8:24.29 min (2014)

International competitions

References

External links

Living people
1992 births
People from Höchstadt
Sportspeople from Middle Franconia
German male steeplechase runners
Universiade medalists in athletics (track and field)
Universiade gold medalists for Germany
Competitors at the 2017 Summer Universiade
Medalists at the 2015 Summer Universiade
21st-century German people